Lincoln MacCauley Alexander  (January 21, 1922 – October 19, 2012) was a Canadian lawyer who became the first Black Canadian member of Parliament in the House of Commons, the first Black federal Cabinet Minister (as federal Minister of Labour), the first Black Chair of the Worker's Compensation Board of Ontario, and the 24th Lieutenant Governor of Ontario from 1985 to 1991. He was the first person to serve five terms as Chancellor of the University of Guelph, from 1991 to 2007. Alexander was also a governor of the Canadian Unity Council.

Early life and education
Alexander was born on January 21, 1922, in a row house on Draper Street near Front Street and Spadina Avenue in Toronto, Ontario. He was the eldest son of Mae Rose (née Royale), who immigrated from Jamaica, and Lincoln McCauley Alexander Sr., a carpenter by trade who worked as a porter on the Canadian Pacific Railway, who had come to Canada from St. Vincent and the Grenadines. Lincoln had a younger brother Hughie, born in 1924, and an older half-brother Ridley "Bunny" Wright, born to his mother in 1920 prior to her marriage to his father. Bunny was never accepted by Lincoln Sr. and was not allowed in Joe's house.

Alexander went to Earl Grey Public School where he was the only Black child in his kindergarten class. He noted in his memoir that he "never raced home from school and cried" but earned the respect of his classmates, sometimes by fighting. This taught him "to always walk tall, and with a certain bearing, so people knew I meant business". In his 2006 memoir, Go to School, You're a Little Black Boy, Alexander recalled: "Blacks at that time made up a sliver-thin portion of the city's population, and racial prejudice abounded." When the family moved to the east end of Toronto, and he attended Riverdale Collegiate, Alexander knew only three Black families. "The scene in Toronto at that time wasn't violent, though you had to know your place and govern yourself accordingly."

His family was religious and enjoyed a social life centered on regularly attending a Baptist church in downtown Toronto. His father was a stern disciplinarian who wanted his son to play the piano. Alexander preferred various sports, including track, soccer, hockey, softball, and boxing; he never learned to swim. His size made him uncoordinated so he was not a natural athlete.

As a teen Alexander's mother moved to Harlem with his half-brother Ridley after his father beat her violently. Lincoln and his brother Hughie were cared for by Sadie and Rupert Downes until his mother could send for one of them. She chose Lincoln; Hughie remained with the Downes family and the brothers grew apart.

In New York he attended DeWitt Clinton High School, the only member of his family to do so. He recalled in his memoir, "[G]iven the message about education that had been pounded into my head since I was a young child, the fact those kids didn’t go to school was an eye-opener for me." As a black community, Harlem allowed him to find role models who worked at jobs that did not involve manual labour.

Second World War
In 1939, after Canada declared war on Germany, his mother sent him back to Toronto to live with his father. Lincoln met Yvonne (Tody) Harrison at a dance in Toronto. The youngest of four daughters of Robert, a railway porter, and his wife Edythe (née Lewis), Harrison lived in Hamilton, Ontario. Alexander was smitten by her and resolved to marry her. Because he was too young to enlist in the armed forces, he took a job as a machinist making anti-aircraft guns at a factory in Hamilton to be close to her.

He first distinguished himself in service to Canada in 1942 as a corporal and wireless operator in the Royal Canadian Air Force during the Second World War. He served in many parts of the country including Portage La Prairie. He was ineligible for combat duty because of poor eyesight.

While stationed in Vancouver, he was refused service at a bar because of his race. He reported the incident to a superior officer who refused to take action.  Alexander quit the Air Force in 1945 and was granted an honourable discharge. Of that incident, he said: "[A]t that time they didn't know how to deal with race relations of this sort of thing; they just turned a blind eye to it."

Post-secondary schooling and legal career
After the war Alexander completed his studies at Hamilton's Central Collegiate and then entered McMaster University in 1946 to study economics and history, receiving a BA in 1949.

At age 25, on September 10, 1948, he married Yvonne "Tody" Harrison, five years his senior. Upon graduating in 1949, he applied for a sales job at Stelco, a steel plant in Hamilton, Ontario. Although he had references, the support of McMaster and the mayor of Hamilton, Stelco was unwilling to have a black man on its sales force. He declined their offer of his old summer job working in the plant.

In 1948, Alexander's mother died at age 49, suffering from dementia; his father committed suicide four years later. He married his first wife, Yvonne Harrison, in 1948; their only child, a son Keith, was born in 1949. In 1986, Alexander said in a Chatelaine magazine interview: "My mother was the single biggest influence on me–before my wife, I’ve always regretted that she didn’t live to see me graduate from university."

Alexander then attended Osgoode Hall Law School in Toronto. While there, he suggested to the Dean during a lecture that he was using inappropriate language: "looking for a nigger in a woodpile". Challenging the Dean he said: "But you can't say that because you have to show leadership. You're in a position of authority, a leader in the community. A leader has to lead and not be using such disrespectful comments without even thinking about them." Of the incident he recalled: "I don't know whatever made me stand up and ask him that in a class of 200 people. ... But I will tell you one thing, that day made me a man." His actions did not end his career as he feared and Alexander graduated from Osgoode Hall in 1953.

After articling for Sam Gottfried, the only job offer he received was from Helen and Edward Okuloski, a brother and sister who had started their own practice in Hamilton when they were unable to find jobs with existing firms. Here he practiced real estate and commercial law and established a political base in the German and Polish communities in Hamilton. Two years later Alexander partnered with Dave Duncan, forming the firm Duncan & Alexander, which he claimed was the first inter-racial law partnership in Canada. Alexander bought his own home on Proctor Blvd in the east end of Hamilton in 1958 and was able to move his family out of his in-laws' house. He lived there for nearly four decades.

In 1960, he and his wife visited twenty-three countries in Africa as volunteers with Operation Crossroads Africa, a trip he said that made him realize: "In Africa, I was a black man and I was somebody." Alexander wrote in his memoir:

The experience was an eye-opener for me not only as a lawyer but also as a human being because I began to realize what black people could do. I saw that, unlike the Hollywood version, these Africans were men and women of significant talents. I became conscious of my blackness. I had come from a white world. Now we were in Africa, and I realized we are people of skill and creativity. I was a black man and I was a somebody. I started standing tall.

In 1962, Alexander's partnership with Duncan was dissolved. He joined former McMaster classmate Jack Millar in the firm Millar, Alexander, Tokiwa and Isaacs, which eventually became known as "the United Nations law firm". In his memoir, Alexander recalls: "A Caucasian, a black, Japanese and a Native Canadian. We were white, black, yellow and red, we used to laugh." He has appointed Queen's Counsel in 1965.

Politics
In 1965, Alexander ran in the Canadian federal election as the Progressive Conservative Party of Canada candidate in the Hamilton West electoral district but was defeated. He ran again in the 1968 federal election and on June 25, 1968, he won the seat, becoming Canada's first black Member of Parliament.

On September 20, 1968, he made his maiden speech in the House of Commons saying:"I am not the spokesman for the Negro; that honor has not been given to me. Do not let me ever give anyone that impression. However, I want the record to show that I accept the responsibility of speaking for him and all others in this great nation who feel that they are the subjects of discrimination because of race, creed or colour"

In 1970, Alexander voted in favor of the War Measures Act invoked by then Prime Minister Pierre Trudeau but later felt he had erred in this decision, saying: "[T]he issue of limiting rights has far more serious implications than I thought at the time. You become vulnerable, grasped by the tentacles of Government power." In 1976, he voted to abolish capital punishment in a free vote introduced by the governing Liberal party.

Alexander wrote in his memoir that he did not shy away from voting with the Liberal government if an issue warranted his support. As an example, he threatened to break ranks with his own party to vote in favour of anti-hate legislation, saying "screw you" to his party's argument that it would curtail freedom of speech. "Are you saying that you can call my son or daughter a nigger and that is free speech?" he asked during debate on the bill. Heath MacQuarrie, then a Tory MP from Prince Edward Island, stood up and said, "I'm not going to let Linc stand alone on this." Together they led 17 members of their caucus in support of the government's legislation.

It was Alexander and Newfoundland MP John Lundrigan who provoked Trudeau into mouthing an obscenity in the House of Commons during a discussion of training programs for the unemployed in February 1971. This quickly became known as the "fuddle duddle" incident.

Alexander was an observer to the United Nations in 1976 and 1978 and served briefly as Minister of Labour in the Progressive Conservative Party's minority government headed by Joe Clark from 1979 to 1980.

He held the seat through four successive elections until resigning his seat on May 27, 1980, when he was asked by then Premier of Ontario Bill Davis to serve as chairman of the Ontario Worker's Compensation Board. He misunderstood Davis's request and recalled: "I said [to the Premier], 'do you think this is going to give you the black vote around here, the vote of the visible minority ...?' I will never forget his look; he was extremely angry. I shouldn't have said that."

Viceregal service

In 1985, on the advice of Prime Minister Brian Mulroney, Governor General Jeanne Sauvé appointed Alexander Lieutenant Governor of Ontario. He became the first black person to serve in a viceregal position in Canada. (James Douglas, who was of mixed descent, was Governor of Vancouver Island and of British Columbia prior to Canadian Confederation when these were British colonies with no connection to the Canadas.)

During his appointment, he focused attention on multicultural issues and education, racism, and youth issues. As viceroy he visited 672 communities, held 675 receptions, received roughly 75,000 guests, attended 4,000 engagements, and visited 230 schools.

Later life

Alexander served as Chair of the Workers Compensation Board of Ontario from 1980 to 1985. The organization underwent its most extensive legislative overhaul since 1915 during his tenure. Also during his tenure, the WCBO sanctioned the use of chiropractors, over the objections of doctors, and created an independent appeals tribunal.

In 1992, Alexander was appointed to the Order of Ontario and became a Companion of the Order of Canada. From 1991 to 2007, he served as Chancellor of the University of Guelph. His fifteen-year term as Chancellor exceeded that of any of his predecessors, and he assumed the office of Chancellor Emeritus in June 2007. He was succeeded as Chancellor by then broadcaster Pamela Wallin.

In 2000, Alexander was named Chair of the Canadian Race Relations Foundation, where he remained an active spokesman on race relations and veterans' issues. Until the time of his death, he was the Honorary Patron of the Hamilton, Ontario, branch of St. John Ambulance, as well as Honorary Chief of the Hamilton Police Service and Honorary Commissioner of the Ontario Provincial Police.

In November 2006, his autobiography Go to School, You're a Little Black Boy: The Honourable Lincoln M. Alexander: A Memoir was published. The title reflects advice his mother had given him as a boy.

Death

Alexander died in his sleep on the morning of October 19, 2012, aged 90. The national and provincial flags outside the Ontario Legislative Building were flown at half-mast and tributes were given by various viceroys and politicians.

His body lay in state, first inside the Ontario Legislative Building at Queen's Park, then at Hamilton City Hall.

He was survived by his son Keith Lincoln Alexander from his marriage to his first wife Yvonne Harrison (died 1999). He was also survived by daughter-in-law Joyce Alexander and grandchildren Erika and Marissa Alexander, and second-wife Marni Beal.

Alexander was accorded an Ontario state funeral conducted by the Reverend Allison Barrett. With the co-operation of thousands of officials, both Provincial and Federal, and Police Services across Canada, and featuring the Burlington Teen Tour Band and, Police Pipe and Drum band, it was conducted at Hamilton Place and attended by 1,500 people. Those in attendance included then-Prime Minister Stephen Harper, former Ontario Premier Dalton McGuinty, then-Ontario Premier Kathleen Wynne, Governor General David Johnston, former Governor General Michaëlle Jean, former Prime Minister Joe Clark, federal cabinet minister Julian Fantino, Dr. Alastair Summerlee, President of the University of Guelph, and Dr. Peter George, former President of McMaster University in Hamilton, Ontario. Also in attendance were the chairman of the Raptors Foundation and the publisher of the Hamilton newspaper, The Spectator.

Legacy
The Province of Ontario proclaimed January 21 "Lincoln Alexander Day" in Ontario. It became law in December 2013. As of December 3, 2014, with Royal Assent by the Governor General on December 9, 2014, January 21 is now recognized officially as "Lincoln Alexander Day" and was celebrated across Canada for the first time in 2015.

In 2018, Canada Post marked Black History Month with stamps featuring Alexander and Kay Livingstone.

Several schools have been named in his honor.

The Lincoln M. Alexander Parkway municipal expressway in Hamilton, Ontario, was named in his honour.

On May 6, 2021, Ryerson University's faculty of law was renamed the Lincoln Alexander School of Law in his honour.

Honours

Appointments
  1965 – October 19, 2012: Queen's Counsel (QC)  
  June 4, 1979 – October 19, 2012: Member of the Queen's Privy Council for Canada (PC)
  1985 – October 19, 2012: Knight of the Order of St. John (KStJ)
  April 30, 1992 – October 19, 2012: Companion of the Order of Canada (CC)
  1992–2012: Member of the Order of Ontario (O.Ont)
  1992– October 19, 2012: Honorary Bencher of the Law Society of Upper Canada  

The Lincoln Alexander Day (across Canada) act passed into law December 3, 2014.

Medals

 : Canadian Volunteer Service Medal
 : War Medal 1939–1945
 : Queen Elizabeth II Silver Jubilee Medal (1977)
 : 125th Anniversary of the Confederation of Canada Medal (1992)
 : Queen Elizabeth II Golden Jubilee Medal (2002)
 : Queen Elizabeth II Diamond Jubilee Medal (2012)
 : Canadian Forces Decoration (CD) 1994

Honorary military appointments
  November 1985December 1996: Honorary Colonel of 2 Tactical Aviation Wing Royal Canadian Air Force

Halls of fame
Canadian Disability Hall of Fame, 1998

Scholastic

 Chancellor, visitor, governor, rector and fellowships

Honorary degrees

Alexander received honorary degrees from numerous universities, including:

Honorary degrees

Other honours
  2002: Law Society Medal of the Law Society of Upper Canada

Honorific eponyms

Awards

  Ontario: Lincoln M. Alexander Award

Roads, highways, and bridges

  Ontario: Lincoln M. Alexander Parkway, Hamilton

Schools

  Ontario: Lincoln Alexander Public School, Ajax
  Ontario: Lincoln Alexander Public School, Hamilton
  Ontario: Lincoln Alexander Public School, Markham
  Ontario: Lincoln M. Alexander Secondary School, Mississauga
  Ontario: Alexander Hall, University of Guelph

Others

  Ontario:  876 Lincoln Alexander Royal Canadian Air Cadets Squadron
  Ontario: Lincoln M. Alexander Building, 777 Memorial Ave, Orillia, OPP headquarters

Arms

References

External links
 The Honourable Lincoln Alexander (1922–2012), online exhibit on Archives of Ontario website

 Description of Lincoln M. Alexander Award
 Short interview after book launch
 biography of his career with the Canadian Air Force
 Autobiography 

1922 births
2012 deaths
Black Canadian politicians
Canadian autobiographers
Canadian Baptists
Canadian people of Jamaican descent
Canadian people of Saint Vincent and the Grenadines descent
Chancellors of the University of Guelph
Companions of the Order of Canada
Knights of Justice of the Order of St John
Lawyers in Ontario
Lieutenant Governors of Ontario
McMaster University alumni
Members of the 21st Canadian Ministry
Members of the House of Commons of Canada from Ontario
Members of the Order of Ontario
Members of the King's Privy Council for Canada
Military personnel from Toronto
Politicians from Hamilton, Ontario
Politicians from Toronto
Progressive Conservative Party of Canada MPs
Royal Canadian Air Force personnel of World War II
DeWitt Clinton High School alumni
Canadian King's Counsel
Black Canadian lawyers
Royal Canadian Air Force airmen
20th-century Baptists
Canadian Disability Hall of Fame